Now: The Hits of Spring 2008 is the 22nd album of the Australian Now! series.

Track listing
 Katy Perry – "I Kissed a Girl" (3:00)
 Miley Cyrus – "See You Again" (3:11)
 Coldplay – "Viva la Vida" (3:45)
 Jason Mraz – "I'm Yours" (4:03)
 Estelle – "American Boy" (4:05)
 Sneaky Sound System – "Kansas City" (3:57)
 The Veronicas – "Take Me on the Floor" (3:30)
 Flo Rida featuring Timbaland – "Elevator" (3:38)
 Gabriella Cilmi – "Don't Wanna Go to Bed Now" (3:10)
 End of Fashion – "Fussy" (4:04)
 September – "Cry for You" (3:30)
 Danity Kane – "Damaged" (4:07)
 Jonas Brothers – "When You Look Me in the Eyes" (4:10)
 Foxboro Hot Tubs – "Mother Mary" (2:48)
 Panic! at the Disco – "That Green Gentleman (Things Have Changed)" (3:15)
 Finger Eleven – "Falling On" (3:08)
 Faker – "Are You Magnetic?" (3:47)
 Something with Numbers – "Stay with Me Bright Eyes" (3:55)
 Jesse McCartney – "Leavin'" (3:38)
 The Verve – "Love Is Noise" (4:05)
 The Wombats – "Kill the Director" (2:44)

External links
 NOW: The Hits of Spring 2008 @ eBay Australia

2008 compilation albums
EMI Records compilation albums
Now That's What I Call Music! albums (Australian series)